PKF may refer to:

Pakistan Korfball Federation
PKF, IATA code for Park Falls Municipal Airport, Park Falls, Wisconsin, US
Paul Karl Feyerabend (1924–1994), Austrian-American philosopher
Peace keeping force
Percy Keese Fitzhugh (1876–1950), American author
PKF International, a network of accounting firms
PKF Karate:
Panamerican Karate Federation, governing body of karate in the Americas 
Philippine Karatedo Federation, governing body of karate in the Philippines 
Polska Kronika Filmowa, Polish Film Chronicle, cinema newsreel 
Pollock-Krasner Foundation
Porto Koufo, the deepest natural harbour in Greece